Religion and the Order of Nature is a 1996 book by the Iranian philosopher Seyyed Hossein Nasr.

See also
 The Encounter of Man and Nature

References

Sources

 
 
 
 

Seyyed Hossein Nasr
Traditionalist School
Metaphysics books